was a Japanese novelist and essayist. He is well known as the first, and so far the only, post-war Japanese writer to identify himself publicly as a Burakumin, a member of one of Japan’s long-suffering outcaste groups. His works depict the intense life-experiences of men and women struggling to survive in a Burakumin community in western Japan. His most celebrated novels include Misaki (The Cape), which won the Akutagawa Prize in 1976, and Karekinada (The Sea of Withered Trees), which won both the Mainichi and Geijutsu Literary Prizes in 1977.

During the 1980s Nakagami was an active and controversial figure in the Japanese literary world, and his work was the subject of much debate among scholars and literary critics. As one reviewer put it, "Nakagami was the first writer from the ghetto to make it into the mainstream and to attempt to tell other Japanese, however fictively or even fantastically, about life at the rough end of the economic miracle."
Nakagami was at the height of his fame when he died, of kidney cancer, at the age of 46.

Major works

"Jukyu sai no chizu" (A Map by a Nineteen-year-old) 1974
Misaki (The Cape) 1976
Jain (Snakelust) 1976
Karekinada (The Sea of Withered Trees) 1977
Hosenka (Forget-me-nots) 1980
Chi no hate shijo no toki (Supreme Time at the End of the Earth)
Sennen no yuraku (A Thousand Years of Pleasure) 1982
Nichirin no tsubasa (Wings of the Sun) 1984
Kiseki (Miracles) 1989
Sanka (Paean) 1990
Keibetsu (Scorn) 1992

Works available in English 
Hanzo's Bird (Trans. Ian Hideo Levy)　Nihon Honyakuka Yosei Center, 1983.
The Immortal (Trans. Mark Harbison) in The Showa Anthology: Modern Japanese Short Stories, Kodansha International, 1985.
The Cape and other stories from the Japanese Ghetto  (Trans. Eve Zimmerman) Stonebridge Press, 1999.
Snakelust  (Trans. Andrew Rankin) Kodansha International, 1999.

Works available in French 
Mille Ans de plaisir (Trans. Véronique Perrin), Fayard, 1988.
La Mer aux arbres morts (Trans. Jacques Lalloz & Kohsuke Ohura), Fayard, 1989.
Sur les ailes du soleil (Trans. Jacques Lalloz), Fayard, 1994.
Hymne (Trans. Jacques Lévy), Fayard, 1995.
Le bout du monde, moment suprême, Fayard, 2000.
Miracle (Trans. Jacques Lévy), Editions Philippe Picquier, 2004.
Le Cap (Trans. Jacques Lévy), Editions Philippe Picquier, 2004

Books about Nakagami 
Mats Karlsson, The Kumano Saga of Nakagami Kenji. Stockholm, 2001.
Eve Zimmerman. Out of the Alleyway: Nakagami Kenji and the Poetics of Outcaste Fiction. Harvard, 2008.
Anne Thelle. Negotiating Identity: Nakagami Kenji’s Kiseki and the Power of the Tale. Iudicium, 2010.
Anne McKnight. Nakagami: Japan, Buraku and the Writing of Ethnicity. University of Minnesota, 2011.
Machiko Ishikawa. Paradox and Representation: Silenced Voices in the Narratives of Nakagami Kenji. Cornell University Press, 2020.

References

Sources 

Short biography
Short biography in French
Kenji Nakagami's grave 
Kenji Nakagami at J'Lit Books from Japan 
 Synopsis of The Kareki Sea (Karekinada) at JLPP (Japanese Literature Publishing Project) 

1946 births
1992 deaths
20th-century Japanese novelists
Japanese critics
Magic realism writers
Akutagawa Prize winners
Writers from Wakayama Prefecture
Deaths from cancer in Japan
Deaths from kidney cancer
20th-century Japanese poets
International Writing Program alumni
Columbia University people
People from Shingū, Wakayama